Zhang Siqing (Chinese: 张思卿; Pinyin: Zhāng Sīqīng; August 1932 – 17 June 2022) was a Chinese politician and magistrate.

Biography
Zhang was born in Luoyang, Henan, China, in 1932. He joined the Communist Party of China in 1952.

He was the President of Hubei High People's Court and Head of Hubei Public Security Bureau, and the Secretary of the Zhengfa Committee of the CPC Hubei Committee from 1983 to 1985.

Zhang entered the Supreme People's Procuratorate in 1985 and became an Associate Procurator. He was elected by the National People's Congress as the Procurator-General of the Supreme People's Procuratorate from 1993 to 1998.

He died from an illness in Beijing on 17 June 2022, at the age of 89.

References

External links
 Zhang Siqing's profile on Xinhuanet

1932 births
2022 deaths
People's Republic of China politicians from Henan
Politicians from Luoyang
20th-century Chinese judges
21st-century Chinese judges
Chinese Communist Party politicians from Henan
Political office-holders in Hubei
Chinese police officers
People of the Republic of China
Vice Chairpersons of the National Committee of the Chinese People's Political Consultative Conference
Procurator-General of the Supreme People's Procuratorate
Burials at Babaoshan Revolutionary Cemetery